Tetragastris tomentosa is a species of plant in the Burseraceae family. It is found in Costa Rica, Nicaragua, and Panama. It is threatened by habitat loss.

References

tomentosa
Vulnerable plants
Taxonomy articles created by Polbot